is a railway station in the city of Mizuho, Gifu Prefecture, Japan, operated by the private railway operator Tarumi Railway.

Lines

Station layout
Mieji Station has one ground-level side platform serving a single bi-directional track. The station is unattended.

Adjacent stations

|-
!colspan=5|Tarumi Railway

History
Mieji Station opened on March 20, 1956.

Surrounding area
 site of former Mieji-juku

See also
 List of Railway Stations in Japan

References

External links

 

Railway stations in Gifu Prefecture
Railway stations in Japan opened in 1956
Stations of Tarumi Railway
Mizuho, Gifu